Claudiu-Iulius-Gavril Năsui (born 5 May 1985) is a Romanian politician and economist.

A member of the Romanian Chamber of Deputies, he was elected for a Bucharest seat in 2020. From 23 December 2020, he served as the Minister of Economy, Entrepreneurship and Tourism in the Cîțu Cabinet, led by national liberal Prime Minister Florin Cîțu, until his resignation took effect on 7 September 2021.

References 

Living people
1985 births
Politicians from Bucharest
21st-century Romanian politicians
Romanian Ministers of Economy
Bocconi University alumni
Save Romania Union politicians
Members of the Chamber of Deputies (Romania)